The Dinosaur Museum is a museum presenting dinosaurs in Dorchester, the county town of Dorset, in southern England.

The Dinosaur Museum is the only museum in mainland Britain dedicated purely to dinosaurs. The museum is not far from the Jurassic Coast to the south, a World Heritage Site.
The museum is based in Icen Way in central Dorchester. It features an outdoor model of a triceratops that was renovated in 2012. At Easter, the museum features a dinosaur Easter egg hunt.

See also
 Charmouth Heritage Coast Centre
 Dinosaurland Fossil Museum
 Lyme Regis Museum
 Jurassica
 Portland Museum

References

External links

The Dinosaur Museum website

Dinosaur museums
Geology museums in England
Museums in Dorchester, Dorset
Education in Dorchester, Dorset
Natural history museums in England